David Ossman (born December 6, 1936 in Santa Monica) is an American writer and comedian, best known as a member of the Firesign Theatre and screenwriter of such films as Zachariah.

Early life
Ossman attended Pomona College, where he starred in productions including The Crucible and Fumed Oak. He transferred to Columbia University.

Career
Ossman's roles during his Firesign years include George Leroy ("Peorgie") Tirebiter on Don't Crush That Dwarf, Hand Me the Pliers and Catherwood in the "Nick Danger" series.

In 1973, he recorded the solo album How Time Flys.  During the 1980s, he left the Firesign Theatre, primarily to produce programs for National Public Radio.

During the 1990s Ossman and his wife Judith Walcutt formed Otherworld Media, through which they produced audio theatre for children, as well as a series of major star-studded audio theatre broadcasts for NPR, including We Hold These Truths (1991), Empire of the Air, War of the Worlds 50th Anniversary Production, Raymond Chandler's Goldfish, and the 100th Anniversary audio theatre adaptation of The Wonderful Wizard of Oz.

His latest Otherworld Media Productions include A Thousand Clowns, Through the Looking Glass, and A Taffetas Christmas. These performances are held at Whidbey Children's Theater on Whidbey Island, a local theatre where children can come to do plays and workshops.

Otherworld Media has also taken on the task of adapting and producing half a dozen screenplays in live radio play format in 2007 and 2008 at the International Mystery Writers Festival in Owensboro, Kentucky. Ossman personally wrote the adaptation and directed the 2007 Angie Award winner Albatross (original screenplay written by Lance Rucker and Timothy Perrin).

Ossman has written a mystery novel, The Ronald Reagan Murder Case: A George Tirebiter Mystery (published by BearManor Media, 2007).  In 2008, Bear Manor Media published his memoir, Dr. Firesign's Follies: Radio, Comedy, Mystery, History.

Stage versions of Don't Crush That Dwarf, Hand Me the Pliers; The Further Adventures of Nick Danger, Third Eye; and Waiting for the Electrician or Someone Like Him and Temporarily Humboldt County are published by Broadway Play Publishing Inc.

Ossman also wrote a book of poetry in 2009 titled Fools & Death (published by Ion Drive Publishing, 2009).

His Old Cart Wrangler's Saga was a finalist for a 2019 Audie Award (APA- Audiobook Publishers Association) in the Original Works category. It was published by Blackstone Publishing in Ashland, OR.

Personal life
On March 19, 2008, Mount Rainier National Park rangers found the body of Ossman's oldest son, Devin, less than two miles from the trailhead where he had parked his car two days earlier for a day hike. His wife had reported him missing the day before.

Ossman also has a daughter, Alizon.

He currently resides on Whidbey Island with his wife.

Ossman was a member of the Church of the SubGenius.

Filmography

Actor
 Martian Space Party (1972, Short)
 Everything You Know Is Wrong (1975, LP) – Sheriff Luger Axehandle / NURGI Clockwork Film narrator / Professor Archer / Art Wholeflaffer / Air Force General
 Below the Belt (1980) (voice)
 The Tick (1996, TV Series) – Professor Peelie (voice)
 A Bug's Life (1998) – Cornelius (voice)
 Nowheresville (2000) – Earl Apple
 Osmosis Jones (2001) – Scabies (voice, uncredited)
 Firesign Theatre: Weirdly Cool (2001, TV Movie) 
 Five Grand (2016) – Abner Wilhelm

Writer
 Zachariah (1971)
 Martian Space Party (1972)
 Everything You Know Is Wrong (1975)
 Firesign Theatre: Weirdly Cool (2001) (TV)
 The Ronald Reagan Murder Case: A George Tirebiter Mystery (2007)
 Fools & Death (2009)
 Fighting Clowns of Hollywood: With Laffs by the Firesign Theatre (2018)

Producer
 Martian Space Party (1972)
 Everything You Know Is Wrong (1975)

Director
 Everything You Know Is Wrong (1975)
 Through the Looking Glass (2006)
 Seven Keys to Baldpate (2007)

Editor
 Martian Space Party (1972)

Discography
 How Time Flys (1973)

References

External links
 

1936 births
Living people
American SubGenii
Writers from Santa Monica, California
The Firesign Theatre
Pomona College alumni